High court is a name for a variety of courts, often with jurisdiction over the most serious issues. 

For countries with a civil law system, the term 'high court' usually refers to appellate court dealing with first stage of appeal from a trial court, serving as an intermediate body before appeal to the constitutional court, court of cassation, supreme court, or other highest judicial body. The Tokyo High Court of Japan is an example of such a body, hearing appeals from district courts (the general trial courts)

In common law countries, mainly those in the former British Empire, the high court is often the superior trial court, and has plenary original jurisdiction, with lower courts (such as district courts or magistrates' courts) having limited jurisdiction; often, the high court tries the most serious offences such as murder, rape, and terrorism. Additionally, a high court may serve as an intermediate appellate body before appeal to a supreme or constitutional court. Some jurisdictions, especially federations, may have multiple high courts each with jurisdiction over a particular region. One notable exception is the High Court of Australia, which has both original and appellate jurisdiction in addition to performing constitutional court-like functions. The tasks of a typical Commonwealth high court are handled by the state supreme courts and the Federal Court.

List of high courts
Alphabetically by name of associated country:

High Court of Australia
High Court of Bhutan
High Court of Botswana
High people's courts in China
The Eastern and Western high courts of Denmark
High Court of Justice (England and Wales), presided over by a High Court judge of that jurisdiction
High Court of Eswatini
High Court of Fiji
High Court (France)
High Court (Germany)
High Court (Guyana)
High Court of the Hong Kong SAR
High courts of India, several courts
High Court (Ireland)
High Court of Justice (Isle of Man)
High courts of Japan
Haute Cour of Jerusalem
High Court of Kenya
High Court (Lesotho)
High court (Malaysia), two courts
High Court (Maldives) (not the Supreme Court)
High Court (Morocco)
High Court (Nepal)
High Court of New Zealand
High Court (Niue)
High Court of Justice in Northern Ireland 
High courts of Pakistan, several courts
High Court of Cassation and Justice (Romania)
High Court of Justiciary (Scotland)
High Court of Singapore
High Court of Sri Lanka
High Court of South Africa
Spanish high courts of justice, several courts
High court (Taiwan), several courts
High Court (Trinidad and Tobago)

See also
 The Roman Rota, and, in exceptional cases, the Apostolic Signatura, are the high courts of the Holy See and Vatican City, under the Pope, who can choose to intervene afterward or beforehand, and has final say
 High Court of Justice
 Superior court
 Appellate court
 Supreme court
 List of supreme courts by country

References

External links
High Court (Zambia)

Courts by type
Supreme courts